Alexander Goldenweiser may refer to:
 Alexander Goldenweiser (anthropologist) (1880–1940), American anthropologist
 Alexander Goldenweiser (composer) (1875–1961), Russian composer, pianist and teacher